Petr Javorek (born 2 September 1986) is a Czech professional footballer who plays as a midfielder for Bohemian Football League club České Budějovice B.

Career
Javorek made his professional debut for Marila Příbram on 19 March 2005, replacing Martin Čupr in a 2–1 away loss to Baník Ostrava.

Notes

References

External links
 
 
 Guardian Football

1986 births
Living people
Footballers from Prague
Czech footballers
Czech First League players
1. FK Příbram players
FC Hlučín players
FC Silon Táborsko players
SK Dynamo České Budějovice players
Association football midfielders
Czech National Football League players
Bohemian Football League players